Indira Park is a public greenspace and park in the heart of Hyderabad, India.  The foundation stone for the Indira Park was laid during September 1975 by Late Faqruddin Ahmed, the then president of India and it was open for the people in the year 1978 with complete landscaping. Indira Park is having 76 acres (31 ha) of area. The park is managed by the Hyderabad Metropolitan Development Authority. It is located in Domalguda, a residential locality which lies along the Hussain Sagar lake. The park contains an award-winning rock garden. Because of its large size and the presence of a large lake in the midst of an urban area, Indira Park is an urban oasis.

Facilities 
In 2001, the civic authorities of Hyderabad planned to construct a rock garden inside the park. A man-made desert and purification of the lake within the park so as to enable a boating facility were also to be taken up. These new plans were to assist the park in its promotion as a tourist destination. Subrata Basu, the then local commissioner of customs and excise duty, had earlier succeeded with a similar rock sanctuary in Shilparamam, an arts and handicrafts village near Hyderabad. In 2002, the rock garden was readied as per the ideas of Basu's designs. While explaining his zeal in design the garden, Basu said that the natural rock formations were in danger from real estate developers. He only wished to preserve them. In the same year, the local government honored Basu's contribution with an award.

The Park has a pathway (dubbed "Statue Path") which showcases abstract cast iron statues. These include various human, animal and abstract forms. 

Sandalwood trees are spread across the park's interiors. Though the sandalwood is inferior in its quality as compared to trees growing in other regions, the bark could be used as firewood and can also be used as an ingredient in cosmetics products.

The park has a large lake which is fed from controlled flow from Hussain Sagar lake. There are boating activities on this lake for recreation.

As a center of agitations 
The park has been a center of agitations by various strata of the society since early 2000. Rallies or sit-ins have been organized towards achieving goals by dalit rights groups, auto rickshaws unions, students and teachers, political leaders, and others. On an average, three such rallies are given permission by the local authorities.

Due to these rallies, normal life has been affected. Mainly school children, college students and medical emergencies get affected because of the traffic that is caused by people congregating for these rallies. Though the local police designs a plan for the participants, their inability to control their movement results in  traffic jams. Due to this infamy, the local media satirically proposed new names such as Dharna Chowk, "Dharnagunj" and "Dharnaguda" to Domalguda, the area that houses the park. Despite a ban on such rallies in the arterial routes of the city, the local police remained ineffective in enforcing this.

References 

Parks in Hyderabad, India